Intel Corporation, an American multinational corporation and technology company headquartered in Santa Clara, California, is the world's largest semiconductor chip manufacturer by revenue. Since its inception, the company has acquired dozens of companies across the global technology industry, with eight multi-billion-dollar acquisitions . Between 1999 and 2003, the company went on an acquisition spree of mostly telecommunications- and networking-related companies, spending $11 billion in the process. Many subsidiaries created in the process—by some estimations, nearly 40—folded or were spun-off at a loss before Intel consolidated the majority of them into the Intel Communication Group and Intel Wireless Communications and Computing Group in 2003. In the turn of the 2010s, Intel went on another acquisition binge, spending $10 billion acquiring Infineon's Wireless Solutions business, security software developer McAfee, among others.

Acquisitions

Stakes

Divestitures

References

Intel